is the railway station in Kata-machi, Shimabara, Nagasaki Prefecture. It is operated by Shimabara Railway and is on the Shimabara Railway Line.

Lines
Shimabara Railway
Shimabara Railway Line

Adjacent stations

Station layout
The station is ground level with 2 side platforms and 2 tracks.

Environs
National Route 251
Shimabara City Office
Shimabara Post Office
Shimabara Castle

History
1913-09-24 - Opens for business.
1989-12 - The existing station building was completed.

References
Nagasaki statistical yearbook (Nagasaki prefectural office statistics section,Japanese)

External links

Shimabara Railway Official Site 

Railway stations in Japan opened in 1913
Railway stations in Nagasaki Prefecture
Stations of Shimabara Railway